Rust is a 2018 Brazilian drama film directed by Aly Muritiba. It was screened in the World Cinema Dramatic Competition section at the 2018 Sundance Film Festival.

Cast
 Giovanni de Lorenzi as Renet
 Tifanny Dopke as Tati
 Enrique Diaz as Davi

References

External links
 

2018 films
2018 drama films
2010s Portuguese-language films
Brazilian drama films
Films about cyberbullying